Nerskogen is a mountain village in the municipality of Rennebu in Trøndelag county, Norway. Nerskogen Chapel is located in the village.

References

Villages in Trøndelag
Rennebu